David Wall may refer to:

 David Wall (actor) (fl. 1990s–2000s), American actor
 David Wall (dancer) (1946–2013), British ballet dancer
 David Wall (racing driver) (born 1983), Australian racing driver
 David S. Wall (fl. 1990s–2020s), British professor of criminology
 David Wall (footballer) (born 1947), former Australian rules footballer

See also
Dave Wahl (fl. 1990s), three-time winner of the World Championship Snowmobile Derby
David Walls (disambiguation)